The V.I.P.s (also known as Hotel International) is a 1963 British comedy-drama film in Metrocolor and Panavision. It was directed by Anthony Asquith, produced by Anatole de Grunwald, and distributed by Metro-Goldwyn-Mayer. The film was written by Terence Rattigan, with a music score by Miklós Rózsa.

It has an all-star cast, including Richard Burton, Elizabeth Taylor, Louis Jourdan, Elsa Martinelli, Maggie Smith, Rod Taylor, Orson Welles, and Margaret Rutherford, who won the Academy Award for Best Supporting Actress as well as the Golden Globe Award for Best Supporting Actress – Motion Picture. The costumes are by Pierre Cardin.

Plot
The film is set within Terminal 3 of London Heathrow Airport during a fog. As flights are delayed, the VIPs (very important people) of the title play out the drama of their lives in a number of slightly interconnected stories. The delays have caused serious hardship for most of the characters and have plunged some of them into a deep personal or financial crisis.

The central story concerns famed actress Frances Andros (Elizabeth Taylor) trying to leave her husband, millionaire Paul Andros (Richard Burton), and fly away with her suitor Marc Champselle (Louis Jourdan). Because of the fog, Andros has the opportunity to come to the airport to persuade his wife not to leave him.

The Duchess of Brighton (Margaret Rutherford) is on her way to Florida to take a job, which will pay her enough money to save her historic home. Meanwhile, film producer Max Buda (Orson Welles) needs to leave London, taking his newest protégée Gloria Gritti (Elsa Martinelli) with him, by midnight if he is to avoid paying a hefty tax bill.

Les Mangrum (Rod Taylor), an Australian businessman, must get to New York City to prevent his business from being sold. His dutiful secretary, Miss Mead (Maggie Smith), is secretly in love with him. It being a matter of great urgency, she decides to approach Paul Andros and ask him to advance a sum of money that will save Mangrum's company.

Buda spots a poster picturing the Duchess's home. She is offered a sum of money if she will permit Buda to use it as a location in a film, enough to keep the house she loves. Andros, meanwhile, about to lose the woman he loves, is spared a possible suicide at the last minute when he and his wife reconcile.

Cast

 Elizabeth Taylor as Frances Andros
 Richard Burton as Paul Andros
 Louis Jourdan as Marc Champselle
 Elsa Martinelli as Gloria Gritti
 Margaret Rutherford as The Duchess of Brighton
 Maggie Smith as Miss Mead
 Rod Taylor as Les Mangrum
 Orson Welles as Max Buda
 Linda Christian as Miriam Marshall
 Dennis Price as Commander Millbank
 Richard Wattis as Sanders
 David Frost as Reporter
 Ronald Fraser as Joslin
 Robert Coote as John Coburn
 Michael Hordern as Airport Director
 Martin Miller as Dr. Schwutzbacher
 Lance Percival as B.O.A.C. Official
 Joan Benham as Miss Potter
 Peter Sallis as Doctor
 Stringer Davis as Hotel Waiter
 Clifton Jones as Jamaican Passenger
 Moyra Fraser as Air Hostess

Uncredited Cast
 Duncan Lewis as Hotel Receptionist
 Raymond Austin as Rolls-Royce Chauffeur
 Cal McCord as Visitor
 Virginia Bedard as Knebworth House visitor
 Jill Carson as Air Hostess
 Ann Castle as Lady Reporter
 Rosemary Dorken as Airport Announcer
 Betty Trapp as Waitress
 Maggie McGrath as Waitress
 Lewis Fiander as Third Reporter
 John Blythe as Barman
 Richard Briers as Meteorological Official
 Richard Caldicot as Hotel Representative
 Reginald Beckwith as Head Waiter
 Terence Alexander as Captain
 Frank Williams as Assistant to Airport Director
 Clifford Mollison as Mr. River the Hotel Manager
 Gordon Sterne as Official
 Joyce Carey as Mrs. Damer
 Angus Lennie as Meteorological Man
 Peter Illing as Mr. Damer

Production

Script
According to a biography of Rattigan, the idea of the film originated with the writer's experience of a flight delay due to fog at London Airport; and one of the story lines is drawn from the true story of actress Vivien Leigh's attempt to leave her husband, actor Laurence Olivier, for the actor Peter Finch, but Leigh got trapped in the VIP lounge at Heathrow due to fog.

Casting
Asquith intended for Sophia Loren to play Taylor's role, remembering the box-office success of The Millionairess (1960) he did with Loren in the main role. However, Taylor, scared by the appeal Loren had for Burton, persuaded Asquith to hire her instead; "Let Sophia stay in Rome", she told him.

This was the first time Australian actor Rod Taylor had played an Australian character on film. Terence Rattigan allowed him to Australian-ise some of the dialogue. Stringer Davis, Rutherford's husband, appears in a tiny role as a sympathetic hotel waiter in a scene with her. Raymond Austin, a stuntman and a friend of Burton, appears in the film as Andros's driver. Television personality David Frost portrays a reporter interviewing the VIPs at the airport.

Filming
The film was shot entirely at MGM-British Studios, Borehamwood, Herts., with a few establishing shots filmed at what was then known as London Airport, later Heathrow. The terminal set was one of the largest ever constructed in the UK.

Reaction

Box office
Critical reaction to the film was mixed. It nevertheless did extremely well at the box office, helped by the enormous publicity attached to Burton and Taylor's Cleopatra, which was out on release.

The film grossed $15,000,000 domestically, earning $7.5 million in U.S. theatrical rentals on a budget of $4 million. In addition to its North American success, it was one of the 12 most popular films in Britain in 1963. It had admissions of 765,804 in France.

Critical
Bosley Crowther of The New York Times praised The V.I.P.s as "a lively, engrossing romantic film cut to the always serviceable pattern of the old multi-character 'Grand Hotel,' and some of the other people in it are even more exciting than the top two stars. Louis Jordan, for instance." Variety called the film "a smooth and cunning brew with most of the ingredients demanded of popular screen entertainment. It has suspense, conflict, romance, comedy and drama ... Its main fault is that some of the characters and by-plots are not developed enough though they and their problems are interesting enough to warrant separate pix. But that is a risk inevitable in any film in which a number of strangers are flung together, each with problems and linked by single circumstance." Philip K. Scheuer of the Los Angeles Times wrote "They can say it's in the tradition of MGM's Grand Hotel and 'Dinner at Eight' all they want; to me it's a grounded High and Mighty. And I do mean grounded—not only at London airport, but in the writing, directing, and some of the acting as well." Richard L. Coe of The Washington Post called it "very good fun—sleek, adroit and enjoyable." The Monthly Film Bulletin wrote "The V.I.P.s is a pretty little cinematic souffle that melts in the mind, but its flavour is spicy and sweet."

The team of Asquith, De Grunwald and Rattigan later produced another portmanteau film, the dramatic The Yellow Rolls-Royce (1964). Robert Murphy disapproved of both films, remarking that "Asquith spent his last years making increasingly banal prestige productions like The V.I.P.s and The Yellow Rolls-Royce".

Novelization
Slightly in advance of the film's release, as was the custom of the era, a paperback novelization of the screenplay was published by Dell Books. The author was renowned crime and western novelist Marvin H. Albert, who also made something of a cottage industry out of movie tie-ins. He seems to have been the most prolific screenplay novelizer of the late '50s through mid '60s, and, during that time, the preeminent specialist at light comedy, though he adapted a few drama scripts as well. The V.I.P.s is what's known as an "inferred novelization" because, although screenwriter Terence Rattigan is not given attribution anywhere on or in the book, the copyright is assigned to Metro-Goldwyn-Mayer. Whether this omission was an editorial error, or a marketing ploy to make Albert's novel seem to be the film's source material (with or without the complicity of Rattigan) is unknown.

In popular culture

The theme music was used as the intro to the Flemish children's TV series Johan en de Alverman.

See also

1963 in film
List of British films of 1963
List of drama films

References

Bibliography

External links
 
 
 
 
 

1963 films
1963 drama films
British anthology films
British drama films
Films scored by Miklós Rózsa
Films directed by Anthony Asquith
Films featuring a Best Supporting Actress Academy Award-winning performance
Films featuring a Best Supporting Actress Golden Globe-winning performance
Films produced by Anatole de Grunwald
Films set in airports
Films set in London
Metro-Goldwyn-Mayer films
Films with screenplays by Terence Rattigan
Films shot at MGM-British Studios
1960s English-language films
1960s British films